Stefan Rahm (born 1 May 1968) is a Swedish sailor. He competed in the Tornado event at the 1992 Summer Olympics.

References

External links
 

1968 births
Living people
Swedish male sailors (sport)
Olympic sailors of Sweden
Sailors at the 1992 Summer Olympics – Tornado
People from Lerum Municipality
Sportspeople from Västra Götaland County